Victor Shaka (born 1 May 1975) is a Nigerian footballer who plays as a forward. His previous club is include Trabzonspor, Happy Valley AA in Hong Kong. He also played for FC Seoul,  Ulsan Hyundai Horangi and Busan I'Cons of the South Korean K League

References

External links
 
 

1975 births
Living people
Association football forwards
Nigerian footballers
Nigerian expatriate footballers
Nigeria international footballers
Trabzonspor footballers
FC Seoul players
Ulsan Hyundai FC players
Busan IPark players
Happy Valley AA players
Süper Lig players
K League 1 players
Hong Kong First Division League players
Expatriate footballers in Turkey
Expatriate footballers in South Korea
Expatriate footballers in Hong Kong
Nigerian expatriate sportspeople in Turkey
Nigerian expatriate sportspeople in South Korea